The National Union Party was the name used by the Republican Party and elements of other parties for the national ticket in the 1864 presidential election during the Civil War. Most state Republican parties did not change their name. The name was used to attract War Democrats, border state voters, and Unconditional Unionist, and Unionist Party members who might otherwise have not voted for Republicans. The National Union Party nominated incumbent Republican President Abraham Lincoln of Illinois and Democrat Andrew Johnson of Tennessee for Vice President. They won the Electoral College 212–21.

Establishment 
The National Union Party was created just before the general election of November 1864, when the Civil War was still in progress. A faction of anti-Lincoln Radical Republicans believed that Lincoln was incompetent and could not be reelected. A number of Radical Republicans formed a party called the Radical Democracy Party and a few hundred delegates met in Cleveland starting on May 31, 1864, eventually nominating John C. Frémont, who had also been the Republicans' first presidential standard-bearer during the 1856 presidential election.

Baltimore Convention 
Republicans loyal to Lincoln created a new name for their party in convention at Baltimore, Maryland during the first week in June 1864 in order to accommodate the War Democrats who supported the war and wished to separate themselves from the Copperheads. This is the main reason why War Democrat Andrew Johnson was nominated for vice president, instead of Vice President Hannibal Hamlin. The National Unionists supporting the Lincoln–Johnson ticket also hoped that the new party would stress the national character of the war.

The convention's temporary chairman, Robert Jefferson Breckinridge of Kentucky, explained that he could support Lincoln on this new ticket for the following reason: 

The National Union Party adopted the following goals as its platform: 

News of his nomination at the 1864 National Union National Convention elicited Lincoln's famous response on June 9, 1864: 

In August 1864, Lincoln wrote and signed a pledge that should he lose the election, he would nonetheless defeat the Confederacy by an all-out military effort before turning over the White House: 

Lincoln did not show the pledge to his cabinet, but asked them to sign the sealed envelope.

Changing mood 
The complexion of the war changed as the election approached. Confederate Commander Robert E. Lee's last victory in battle occurred June 3, 1864 at Cold Harbor. Union General Ulysses S. Grant's aggressive tactics trapped Lee in the trenches defending Richmond. Admiral David Farragut successfully shut down Mobile Bay as a Confederate resource in the Battle of Mobile Bay on August 3–23, 1864. Most decisive of all, Union General William Tecumseh Sherman captured Atlanta on September 1, 1864, convincing even the pessimists that the Confederacy was collapsing.

Frémont withdraws 
Frémont and his fellow Republicans hated their former ally Postmaster General Montgomery Blair. Frémont, aware that his candidacy could result in victory for the Democrats, made a deal to drop out of the presidential race in exchange for Blair's removal from office. On September 22, 1864, Frémont dropped out of the race. On September 23, Lincoln asked for and received Blair's resignation. 

The National Union ticket went on to win handily in the election of 1864, defeating the Democratic ticket of former Union General George B. McClellan (whom Lincoln had previously relieved of his command) and Representative George H. Pendleton from Ohio.

Election 

In the 1864 congressional elections, the party won 42 Senate seats (out of 54 senators seated, not including vacancies due to the secession of Confederate states) and 149 seats (out of 193) in the House of Representatives. These candidates ran under various party names, including National Union, Republican and Unconditional Union, but were part of the overall Republican/National Union effort.

Post-Lincoln: Andrew Johnson presidency (1865–1869) 

Upon Lincoln's death in 1865, Andrew Johnson became the only other National Union President.

After the bitter break with the Republicans in Congress over Reconstruction policies, Johnson used federal patronage to build up a party of loyalists, but it proved to be unsuccessful. Johnson's friends sponsored the 1866 National Union Convention in August 1866 in Philadelphia as part of his attempt at maintaining a coalition of supporters. The convention sought to bring together moderate and conservative Republicans and defecting Democrats and forge an unbeatable coalition behind President Johnson and his Reconstruction policy.

In the fall of 1866, Johnson embarked upon a speaking tour (known as the "Swing Around the Circle") before the 1866 Congressional elections to attempt to garner support for his policies. His swing was heavily ridiculed and proved ineffective as more of his opponents were elected. Republican National Committee chairman Henry Jarvis Raymond (1864–1866) lost the regard of the Republicans for his participation in the convention. The National Union movement became little more than the Democratic Party in a new form as Republicans left the movement and returned to the old party fold by the fall.

The last congressman to represent the National Union Party ended his affiliation with the party in March 1867. Johnson was impeached by the Republican-led House of Representatives in 1868 and was acquitted in the Senate by one vote. Upon the 1869 expiration of Johnson's only term as President, the National Union Party came to an end. The platform adopted at the 1868 Republican National Convention strongly repudiated President Johnson while the platform adopted by the 1868 Democratic National Convention thanked Johnson. Johnson received dozens of votes on the first ballot of the Democratic convention, but the party ultimately nominated Horatio Seymour. Meanwhile, the mainline Republicans decided at their 1868 national convention to use the term the National Union Republican Convention. The 1868 National Union Republican delegates nominated Ulysses S. Grant for President and his running mate Schuyler Colfax for Vice President. In 1872, all reference to Union had disappeared. Historians regard the initial National Union coalition assembled in 1864 as part of the Republican Party lineage and heritage.

See also 
 1866 National Union Convention
 History of the United States Democratic Party
 History of the United States Republican Party

Citations

General references
Donald, David (1995). Lincoln,  pp. 516–544 online

Johnson, David (2012). Decided on the Battlefield: Grant, Sherman, Lincoln and the Election of 1864. 
Nevins, Allan (1971). The War for the Union: The Organized War to Victory, 1864–1865.  pp 97–143.
Nicolay, John G. and John Hay (1890). Abraham Lincoln: A History. vol 9. ch. 3, 15 and 16.
 McSeveney, Samuel T. (1986). "Re-Electing Lincoln: The Union Party Campaign and the Military Vote in Connecticut". Civil War History. 32(2). pp. 139–158.
Waugh, John C. (2001). Reelecting Lincoln: The Battle for the 1864 Presidency. online
 Wilson, Charles R. (1936) “New Light on the Lincoln-Blair-Fremont ‘Bargain’ of 1864" American Historical Review 42#1 pp. 71–78. online

Zornow, William Frank (1954). Lincoln and the Party Divided. online

1864 establishments in the United States
1864 United States presidential election
1868 disestablishments in the United States
American Civil War political groups
Defunct political parties in the United States
Defunct political party alliances in North America
Political parties disestablished in 1868
Political parties established in 1864
Political party alliances in the United States
Republican Party (United States)